The men's 200 metre freestyle event at the 2010 Asian Games took place on 17 November 2010 at Guangzhou Aoti Aquatics Centre.

There were 29 competitors from 17 countries who took part in this event. Four heats were held, with most containing the maximum number of swimmers (eight). The heat in which a swimmer competed did not formally matter for advancement, as the swimmers with the top eight times from the entire field qualified for the finals.

Defending champion Park Tae-hwan from South Korea won the gold medal with 1 minute 44.80 seconds, which also broke the Asian record.

Schedule
All times are China Standard Time (UTC+08:00)

Records

Results 
Legend
DNS — Did not start

Heats

Final

References
 16th Asian Games Results

External links 
 Men's 200m Freestyle Heats Official Website
 Men's 100m Freestyle Ev.No.9 Final Official Website

Swimming at the 2010 Asian Games